Allan McCready  (1 September 1916 – 8 August 2003) was a New Zealand politician of the National Party.

Biography

McCready was born in Kawakawa in 1916, the son of Alexander McCready. He received his education at Kawakawa District High School. In 1942, McCready married Grace Lorraine Maher, the daughter of Jimmy Maher, later the MP for Otaki. They had one son and one daughter. In World War II he served in the New Zealand Army for 3½ years.

He worked for the Post Office Department for ten years. He was then the director of the Wellington Dairy Farmers Co-op, and then director of the Hutt Valley Milk Treatment Corporation, the Featherston Co-op, and finally the Dairy Company Limited. He was vice-president of the Wellington and Hutt Valley A & P Association.

He was a Cabinet Minister in the Second and Third National Government, including the position of Postmaster-General (1969–1972), Minister of Marine and Fisheries (1969–1972), Minister of Defence (1975–1978), and Minister of Police (1975–1978).

In the 1992 Queen's Birthday Honours, McCready was appointed a Companion of the Queen's Service Order for public services. McCready died on 8 August 2003, aged 86. He was survived by his wife and children.

Notes

References

|-

|-

|-

1916 births
2003 deaths
Members of the Cabinet of New Zealand
New Zealand defence ministers
New Zealand National Party MPs
Companions of the Queen's Service Order
Members of the New Zealand House of Representatives
New Zealand MPs for North Island electorates
People from Kawakawa, New Zealand
Unsuccessful candidates in the 1954 New Zealand general election
Unsuccessful candidates in the 1957 New Zealand general election
New Zealand military personnel of World War II
People educated at Bay of Islands College